Blue Star 1 is a Greek ferry, which is owned by Blue Star Ferries and currently being chartered by Irish Ferries. She is a motor Ro-Ro/Passenger ferryboat, built in 2000 by Van der Giessen de Noord shipward in Krimpen aan den IJssel, Netherlands. She is a sistership to Blue Star 2. She holds a total of 1600 passengers and 640 vehicles and has 430 beds in 161 cabins for passengers. She has four MAN B&W 8L58 / 64 diesel engines, with combined power of 44,480 kW and reaches speeds of up to 27 knots.

History

1998–2009: First years 
The ship was ordered in 1998 by Strintzis Lines. The keel was laid on August 24, 1999 and was launched at December 18 of the same year. She was intended to be named Superferry Atlantic and serve Brindisi – Patras line. However, after Strintzis Lines' acquisition of 48% stake by Attica Enterprise and renaming to Blue Star Ferries, she got her current name. She was delivered on June 6, 2000 and on June 13, she was deployed by between Ancona – Brindisi – Patras, connecting Italy with Greece. By 2001, Brindisi was no longer included on her route, despite her excellent results here. Instead she was now stopping to Igoumenitsa from April to October. On 2002, due to the Superfast III and IV being sold, she had to replace them and the call in Igoumenitsa became regular. On March 4, 2005, she was replaced by her sistership, and returned to Adriatic, this time between Patras – Igoumenitsa – Bari. The last day of her on that route was on January 3, 2007.

Afterwards, she arrived at Neorion Shipyards, Syros island for extension on deck 9: Although the passenger capacity decreased, 15 new cabins were added and some crew cabins became passenger cabins. On January 26, she departed Piraeus towards Zeebrugge, where she arrived 3 days later. Once she arrived, she was deployed between Zeebrugge – Rosyth, in order to cover the space left by the Superfast X, which was sold earlier, until September 14, 2008. She was then returned to Greece and arrived in Patras on September 19. 5 days later she returned on the Patras – Igoumenitsa – Bari line.

2010-2021 
After 3 years on the Patras Igoumenitsa line, in 2011, she was deployed between Patras-Igoumenitsa-Ancona between February 10 and March 21. The following day she returned on the Patras-Igoumenitsa-Bari line for three more days until deploying between Piraeus – Syros – Santorini – Patmos – Leros – Kos – Rhodes, serving the Aegean Sea from the first time in 6 years.  On February 1, 2012, she was deployed between Piraeus – Heraklion, under the ANEK-Attica joint venture, for one year, before returning to the Adriatic Sea on November 15, 2013.

She was then deployed between Patras – Igoumenitsa – Ancona, for one month before returning to the Aegean Sea on December 9. Since then, she operated the following lines:

2021-present 

In 2021, the Blue Star 1 was chartered by Irish Ferries for its Pembroke to Rosslare route in order to replace the Isle of Inishmore, which will serve Irish Ferries' new route between Dover and Calais. The charter is likely to last for two years.

Liveries 
Original livery

The original consisted of a blue hull with the Blue Star Ferries logo in it, plus the "STRINTZIS LINES" text, referring to the company's old name. The decks were white with a black horizontical stripe in the middle deck. The funnel was orange with a blue star.

Current livery

The "STRINTZIS LINES" text was later removed from the livery.

"Superfast" livery

During her brief service in the North Sea, along with her formal Blue Star livery, she also had a "Joint service with" text along with the Superfast logo in a red background.

"ANEK, Superfast" livery

While briefly operating in the Piraeus-Heraklion line, along with the formal Blue Star livery, she also had the ANEK, Superfast logo on a white background.

"Irish Ferries" livery

In 2021 she was repainted in an Irish Ferries livery for her charter to the company, this involved the replacement of the Blue Star Ferries logo on the hull with an Irish Ferries logo as well as the repainting of the funnel to green with the Irish Ferries logo.

Route 
Blue Star 1 serves Rosslare (Ireland) to Pembroke (Wales).

References

External links 

 Ship's current position in Marinetraffic.com
Blue Star 1 on Blue Star Ferries
Tribute to the ship by Archipelagos.com
Forum about Blue Star 1 in Shipfriends.gr
Forum about Blue Star 1 in Mesametaforas.gr

Ro-ro ships
Ships of Blue Star Ferries
1999 ships
Ferries of Greece
Ships built in the Netherlands